Sri Lokanath is a 1960 Indian Odia-language film directed by Prafulla Sengupta and based on a story by Aswini Kumar Ghosh. This Indian socio-fantasy film won a National Film Award in 1960, and was the 11th Odia film produced under Ruprang Pvt. Ltd. It was the first Odia film to receive a National Award.

Plot
Dr. Ajay Patanayak, a doctor by profession doesn't believe in the existence of God. His wife Basanti, having no child, has immense faith in God. she is also deeply attached to his brother-in-law Bijay. Laxmi, a neighbor, has a love interest with Bijay. Bijay visits Puri's Sri Lokanath Temple for a blessing with a hope that his sister-in-law gets a son. Basanti becomes pregnant and delivers a son. The happy family named the child as "Lokanath" after the deity. As Lokanath grows up, Bijay feels neglected by the family and leaves the house. Bijay becomes a tutor in Jaipur. In the meanwhile, his love interest Laxmi marries to a Zamindar named Surya of Puri.

Three years elapse, Basanti and his husband in Puri offer oblation to Lord Sri Lokanath, but they are however prevented from visiting the temple by a storm. The child Lokanath is bitten by a snake and his body is taken to the cremation ground. Basanti, now suffering from amnesia, starts a pilgrimage with her husband. In the meanwhile, Bijay, involved in an accident, becomes half mad.

Years have gone by, Laxmi and Surya have got a daughter Uma, who has a love interest with Ashok, son of Prakash, a friend of Surya. One day while Ashok is driving, a lunatic thrusts himself upon his car. Ashok takes him to Uma's house, where Uma recognize the man as Bijay. the message is conveyed to Ajay and Basanti. Bijay partially recovers his memory in Sri Lokanath Temple.

Basanti feels attracted towards Ashok and tries to arrange the marriage of Uma with him. Prakash discloses that Ashok is not his child, after seeing Ashok's child's photo, Ajay and Basanti recognise him as their own child, Loknath. All the family members are united and go to Sri Loknath Temple. Ajay lastly admits that some heavenly power is guiding human destiny.

Cast
Akshaya Mohanty
Manimala
Urbashi
Dukhiram Swain

Soundtrack
"Phoola Rasiyare" - Sandhya Mukherjee
"Chanhena Chanhena Michha E Bandhana"
"Tuki Paradeshi Nija Deshe"
"Aji Akashe Ki Ranga Lagila Chora Pabane"

Awards
National Film Awards
 1960: President's silver medal for Best Feature Film in Oriya

References

External links

1960 films
1960s Odia-language films
Films based on short fiction